Capital punishment is a legal penalty in Laos. Crimes that are punishable by execution include murder; terrorism; drug trafficking; drug possession; robbery; kidnapping; obstructing an officer in the performance of his public duties and causing his death or causing him physically disability; disrupting industry, trade, agriculture or other economic activities with the intent of undermining the national economy; treason and espionage. Executions are carried out by a firing squad. In March 2009, the government of Laos reported to Amnesty International that at the end of 2008, there were 85 people on death row. The last known execution in Laos took place in 1989.

References

Laos
Penal system in Laos
Death in Laos
Human rights abuses in Laos